Kraszna county (Hungarian: Kraszna vármegye) was a historic administrative county (comitatus) of the Kingdom of Hungary along the river Kraszna, its territory is now in north-western Romania. Its capital cities were Krasznavár (today in), Valkóvár and Szilágysomlyó.

References

Sources

Counties in the Kingdom of Hungary